Friedrich Ueberweg (22 January 1826 – 9 June 1871), was a German philosopher and historian of philosophy.

Biography
Friedrich Ueberweg was born in Leichlingen, Rhineland. His parents were Johann Gottlob Friedrich Ueberweg (19 August 1797 - 9 February 1826), who was pastor of a Lutheran church in Leichlingen, and Helene Boeddinghaus (24 October 1798 - 8 August 1868). Helene was a daughter of Karl Theodor Boeddinghaus (21 February 1765 - 27 December 1842), who was a Lutheran pastor in the neighboring town of Ronsdorf.

Educated at the University of Göttingen and the Humboldt University of Berlin, Friedrich qualified at the University of Bonn as Privatdozent in philosophy (1852). In 1862 he was called to the University of Königsberg as extraordinary professor, and in 1867 he was promoted to the grade of professor ordinarius. He married Anna Henriette Luise Panzenhagen (24 August 1844 - 16 March 1909) on 1 September 1863, in Pillau, Province of Prussia. Ueberweg died in Königsberg in 1871.

Philosophy
At first Ueberweg followed the empiricism of Friedrich Eduard Beneke (1798-1854), and strongly opposed the subjectivistic tendency of the Kantian system, maintaining in particular the objectivity of space and time, which involved him in a somewhat violent controversy. His own mode of thought he preferred later to describe as an ideal realism, which refused to reduce reality to thought, but asserted a parallelism between the forms of existence and the forms of knowledge. Beneke and Friedrich Schleiermacher exercised most influence upon the development of his thought.

Selected works
De elementis animae mundi Platonicae (On the elements of the Platonic world of ideas), Dissertation, 1850
Die Entwicklung des Bewußtseins durch den Lehrer und Erzieher (The development of consciousness by the teacher and educator), 1853
System der Logik und Geschichte der logischen Lehren (System of Logic and History of Logical Doctrines), 1857
Über Idealismus, Realismus und Idealrealismus (On idealism, realism and ideal-realism), 1859
Über die Echtheit und Zeitfolge der platonischen Schriften (On the authenticity and chronology of the Platonic writings), 1861
Grundriß der Geschichte der Philosophie (Sketch of the history of philosophy), I–III, 1863–1866
Schiller als Historiker und Philosoph (Schiller as historian and philosopher), 1884
Die Welt- und Lebensanschauung Friedrich Ueberwegs in seinem gesammelten philosophisch-kritischen Abhandlungen (Collected philosophical papers), Leipzig: Gustav Engel, 1889

Ueberweg's compendious Sketch of the History of Philosophy (3 vols., 1863–1866) is regarded by many academics and scholars as remarkable for its fullness of information, conciseness, accuracy and impartiality.

References

Sources
 Endnotes:
Friedrich Albert Lange (1828-1875) - Friedrich Ueberweg (Berlin, 1871)
Moritz Brasch (1843-1895) - Die Welt und Lebensanschauung Friedrich Ueberwegs (Leipzig, 1889)

1826 births
1871 deaths
19th-century essayists
19th-century German male writers
19th-century German historians
19th-century German philosophers
German consciousness researchers and theorists
Epistemologists
German historians of philosophy
German logicians
German male essayists
German male non-fiction writers
Humboldt University of Berlin alumni
Metaphysics writers
Ontologists
People from the Rhine Province
Philosophers of logic
Philosophers of mind
Philosophers of time
Platonists
German scholars of ancient Greek philosophy
Academic staff of the University of Bonn
University of Göttingen alumni
Academic staff of the University of Königsberg